Ethipothala Falls is a  high river cascade, situated in Palnadu district, Andhra Pradesh, India. Located on the Chandravanka river, which is a tributary of River Krishna joining on its right bank. The waterfall is a combination of three streams namely Chandravanka Vagu, Nakkala Vagu and Tummala Vagu. A strategic view point was created by the Andhra Pradesh Tourism Department from the adjacent hillock. There is a crocodile breeding centre in the pond formed by the waterfall. Water from the Nagarjuna Sagar right bank canal is released in to the above streams to keep the waterfall alive and flowing throughout the year for tourism purposes.

This place also has a very huge spiritual significance,  it is a place where there is a temple of Lord Dattatreya with Ekamukhi. The Lord Dattatreya is the main worship god for Lambadi Tribal people around this place. They will offer prayers and sevas to the Lord without knowing any mantras. The waterfall is a combination of three streams namely, the Chandra Vanka stream on Macherla, Surya bhaga stream on Nagarjuna hill and Krishna river of Nagarjuna sagar. Hence, it is like a Triveni sangama. The sight of the waterfalls as it cascades down a number of steps is a wonderful sight immediately after the monsoons. Just adjacent to the falls is located Datta Guru's Temple.

The Datta temple is atop a small hillock. The Datta idol can be visualized in a blissfully intoxicated state–the gross parallel state. Below the hillock is the Madhumathy Devi Alayam. The Uttaranga mantras for Anushtup are Madhumati Mahavidya and Sri Datta Sahasrakshari

It is very rare to find such a Mandira wherein both Lord Dattatreya and Goddess Madhumathy devi are together. Yoga lakshmi devi is in the form of Madhumathi devi. The rule is that first one must have a Darshan of the Goddess and then have Datta-darshana. In this kshetra, Dattaguru is fulfilling the desires in the form of Swapna (dreams), Sparsha (touch), Drishya (vision) and vachasa vidhana. This kshetra is an ANANDA NILAYA for Poorna yoga and Paripoorna yoga. The form of Dattatreya in this kshetra is same as in Dhyana sloka of Dattatreya.

Etymology of Ethipothala and Confusion
Alternatively it could also have been possibly derived from "eththu" (noun form of the verb eththi - 'lifting', and also the great height from which the water falls) and "potha", meaning the downpour as in kundapotha, connoting the downpour of water from a great height.

Incidentally the word ethipothala is also terminology coined in Telugu for lift irrigation. It is a misnomer for people to assume that Ethipothala Falls are part of the Lift Irrigation Scheme. As far as Ethipothala Falls are concerned it has nothing to do with the government's "Ethipothala Padhakam".

The reasons for this confusion is because the administration and media in the state widely use the term "Ethipothala Padhakam" to refer to the Lift Irrigation Scheme (LIS). Both terms are related to water bodies such as rivers, falls, canals, etc. There is also a major irrigation project named Nagarjuna Sagar located nearby Ethipothala Falls. This gives a scope for people to assume that these falls are part of that project, though that project does not concern the LIS.

Photos

References

Waterfalls of Andhra Pradesh
Tourist attractions in Guntur district
Geography of Guntur district
Cascade waterfalls
Waterfalls of India